Ethiopia competed at the 1960 Summer Olympics in Rome, Italy. Ten competitors, all men, took part in eight events in two sports. Abebe Bikila won the country's first ever Olympic medal by winning the men's marathon.

Medalists

Athletics
Five male athletes represented Ethiopia in 1960:

Key
Note–Ranks given for track events are within the athlete's heat only
Q = Qualified for the next round
q = Qualified for the next round as a fastest loser or, in field events, by position without achieving the qualifying target
N/A = Round not applicable for the event
Bye = Athlete not required to compete in round

Men

Cycling

Five male cyclists represented Ethiopia in 1960.

Road

Time trial

References

External links
Official Olympic Reports
International Olympic Committee results database

Summer Olympics
Nations at the 1960 Summer Olympics
1960 Summer Olympics